Vivalia is an unincorporated community in Parke and Putnam counties, in the U.S. state of Indiana.

History
A post office was established at Vivalia in 1882, and remained in operation until 1905. According to Ronald L. Baker, the origin of the name Vivalia is obscure.

Geography

References

Unincorporated communities in Parke County, Indiana
Unincorporated communities in Putnam County, Indiana
Unincorporated communities in Indiana